The 2014 East Coast Bullbars Australian Rally Championship was the 47th season of the Australian Rally Championship, one of the world's oldest continuously run rally championships. The season began 28 February at the National Capital Rally, and ended 15 November at Rally Victoria, after six events. The championship incorporated two international events; Round 5 was a World Rally Championship event, Rally Australia, while Round 3, the International Rally of Queensland was a round of the Asia-Pacific Rally Championship. Each domestic rally was contested over two heats, with three or four components to the two international events.

The championship was won for the first time by Scott Pedder, taking a total of eight heat wins and the overall wins for the two international events. He won the title by 44 points ahead of Brendan Reeves, who took 5 heat wins during the season. Third place in the championship was taken by Adrian Coppin, who took podium placings in eight heats without victory. The only other driver to take a heat win was Steven Mackenzie, who won the final heat of the season, at Rally Victoria.

Event calendar and results

The 2014 Australian Rally Championship was as follows:

Championship standings
The 2014 Australian Rally Championship points were as follows:

Australian Championship

References

External links
Official website

2014
Australian
Rally Championship